The Frontier Centre for Public Policy (FCPP) is a Canadian public policy think tank, founded to undertake research and education projects in support of economic growth and social outcomes that enhance quality of life. The group claims to be non-partisan, however, their views have been interpreted by some as neoliberal, or right-libertarian. Among the positions promoted by the Centre is climate change denial.

Publications and controversies

Canadian Indian residential school system
In September 2018, the Frontier Centre ran a radio ad which claimed to debunk myths about the lasting impact of the abuses of the Canadian Indian residential school system that resulted in the deaths of 6000 Indigenous children and was classified as form of cultural genocide by a six-year study undertaken by the Truth and Reconciliation Commission. James Daschuk, a professor specializing in Indigenous health at the University of Regina, described the Frontier Centre's position as "egregiously wrong" and "knowingly turning its back on the facts." Assembly of First Nations National Chief Perry Bellegarde also denounced the ad for downplaying the extensive research and evidence on the negative impact of the residential schools. The Frontier Centre released a statement saying that ad was aimed at "a wider non-traditional audience" and was based on the think tank's own publications.

The Centre published in 2021 an anthology of 13 articles criticizing editorial, legal and historical defects in the publications of the Truth and Reconciliation Commission of Canada (2015). A general theme was that the TRC 500-page Summary,  published first, does not reflect even-handedly the 3,000 other pages of the final report (in six volumes.)

Climate Change
In 2011 and 2012 the Frontier Centre put on its website and in letters allegations made by Timothy Ball against climate scientist Michael E. Mann, who issued a lawsuit. In June 2019 the Frontier Centre apologised for publishing "untrue and disparaging accusations which impugned the character of Dr. Mann." It said that Mann had "graciously accepted our apology and retraction".

Funding

The Frontier Centre does not receive government funding. Funding comes from private charitable foundations (63%) such as the Aurea Foundation and the Heartland Institute, businesses (18%), individuals (18%), and by events (1%).

References

External links
 

Climate change denial
1997 establishments in Canada
Think tanks established in 1997
Non-profit organizations based in Manitoba
Organizations based in Winnipeg
Libertarian think tanks
Political and economic think tanks based in Canada